Blørstad is a neighbourhood in the city of Kristiansand in Agder county, Norway. It is located in the borough of Vågsbygd and in the district of Slettheia. Blørstad has residential and industrial areas. It lies north and west of Fiskåtangen, southeast of Kartheia, and south of Hannevika.

References

Geography of Kristiansand
Neighbourhoods of Kristiansand